The Hotel Cecil is one of the oldest hotels in Tangier, Morocco. The hotel was built in 1865. Hotel Cecil is scheduled to be rebuilt. It was originally located on Avenue d'Espagne, number 11, now Avenue Mohammed VI.

References 

Hotels in Morocco
History of Tangier
1860s establishments in Morocco
19th-century establishments in Morocco
Buildings and structures in Tangier
19th-century architecture in Morocco